Kara Ahmed Pasha (executed 29 September 1555) was an Ottoman statesman of Albanian origin. He was Grand Vizier of the Ottoman Empire between 1553 and 1555.

He led the Ottoman troops that captured the Hungarian fortress of Temesvár, defended by the troop of István Losonczy, on 26 July 1552. That year, his army took three other castles (Veszprém, Szolnok and Lipova) before failing at the siege of Eger.

After Sultan Suleiman executed his eldest son Şehzade Mustafa in October 1553, there appeared some sort of dissatisfaction and unrest among soldiers who blamed Rüstem Pasha for Mustafa's death. Then Suleiman dismissed Rüstem Pasha and appointed Kara Ahmed Pasha as his Grand Vizier in October 1553. But almost two years later, Kara Ahmed was strangled by Suleiman's order in September 1555. It is said that the reason for the execution was due to political manoeuvrings of Suleiman's legal wife Hürrem Sultan, who wanted her son-in-law Rüstem to become the Grand Vizier again. After the death of Kara Ahmed, Rüstem Pasha became the Grand Vizier (1555–1561) once more.

Depictions in literature and popular culture
In the TV series Muhteşem Yüzyıl, Kara Ahmed Pasha is played by Turkish actor Yetkin Dikinciler.

See also
 List of Ottoman Grand Viziers

References 

16th-century Grand Viziers of the Ottoman Empire
Albanian Grand Viziers of the Ottoman Empire
Albanians from the Ottoman Empire
Year of death unknown
Devshirme
Suleiman the Magnificent
Executed people from the Ottoman Empire
Grand Viziers of Suleiman the Magnificent
Executed Albanian people
16th-century executions by the Ottoman Empire
Year of birth missing
1555 deaths
16th-century Albanian people